The Corpus Christi Terminal Railroad  was a terminal railroad originally created in 1924 to facilitate heavy bulk freight cargo traffic flow from the recently completed deep water port channel of the new Corpus Christi Port. Wishing to maximize freight handling potential while holding down rates, the Port Authority decided to allow traffic to all of its docks and facilities by no less than three competing railroads, the Southern Pacific, the Missouri Pacific and the Tex-Mex railroads. To accomplish this the Port of Corpus Christi Authority built its own trackage along the channel and to the docks, and allowed all three carriers access to it. While the Authority's scheme at first heightened tensions among the three railroads, they eventually began to cooperate, assuring a good flow of bulk freight and the eventual success of the Port facilities.

As of 2007 railroad connections existed with the Union Pacific, BNSF and Texas Mexican railroads.

Motive power

Table information

Note: The company's general manager has confirmed that CF7s are no longer on the company roster. No. 475 and No. 547 remained in the local area after being sold to ADM Grain, 2122 Navigation Boulevard, Corpus Christi, TX 78402 and repainted in silver with black tops. They can be easily seen from Navigation Boulevard. Additionally, EMD GP locomotives with G&W paint schemes have been added to the CCPN roster.

References

Switching and terminal railroads
Texas railroads
Genesee & Wyoming
Transportation in Corpus Christi, Texas